Dohani  is a village development committee in Kapilvastu District in the Lumbini Zone of southern Nepal. When the 1991 Nepal census came around, Dohani had a population of 4253 people living in 716 individual households. This village is the head quarter of Kapilvastu ward no.8.

References

Populated places in Kapilvastu District